Kyrgyz Academy of Sciences (official name National Academy of Sciences of the Republic of Kyrgyzstan), originally part of the Soviet Academy of Sciences, was established as an independent entity by government decree in December 1993.

The aims of the Academy are to carry out research in natural, engineering, and social sciences, to train scientists in all fields of knowledge, to advise the government in matters of scientific policy, and to disseminate knowledge. The Academy defines the research topics in the national research institutions, coordinates basic research funded by the state, participates in international organizations, and organizes symposia and conferences to discuss scientific issues and coordinate research. As of 2008, there are 37 academicians, 57 corresponding members, and 7 foreign members. Academician Murat Djumataev was elected to a position as the new president of the Academy on 31 October 2017.

History
The history of the Kyrgyz Academy of Sciences begins in 1943 when Kyrgyz Branch of the Academy of Sciences of the USSR was established. It included institutes of geology, biology, chemistry, language, and history. An increasing potential of the branch resulted in establishing the Academy of Sciences of Kyrgyz SSR by a decree of the Council of Ministers of the Soviet Union on August 17, 1954. Among 8 research units of the Academy were institutes of: chemistry, geology, botanic, water management and energy, history, zoology and parasitology, language and literature, and medicine. In December 1993, the Academy of Sciences was transformed into National Academy of Sciences with newly established South branch.

Departments and Institutions
The Academy has 3 major departments (sections), specifically: 
 Physico Technical, Mathematical, and Mining and Geological Sciences, 
 Chemical Engineering, Medical and Biological, and Agrarian Sciences, and 
 Social Sciences
Each of departments consists of scientific institutes, and centers.

Department of Physico Technical, Mathematical, and Mining and Geological Sciences

 Institute of Automatics and Information Technologies
 Institute of Machine Science
 Institute of Theoretical and Applied Mathematics
 Institute of Physico Technical Problems and Material Engineering
 Institute of Water Problems and Hydroenergetics
 Institute of Geology
 Institute of Rock Mechanics and Exploration of Mineral Resources
 Institute of Seismology

Department of Chemical Engineering, Medical and Biological, and Agrarian Sciences 

 Institute of Biotechnology
 Institute of Forest after G.A.Gan
 Botanical Garden after E.Z Gareev
 Institute of Chemistry and Chemical Engineering
 Institute of Mountain Physiology 
 Innovation Center of Phytotechnologies
 Botanic and Soils Institute

Department of Social Sciences

 Institute of History and Cultural Heritage
 Institute of Language and Literature after Ch.T.Aitmatov
 Institute of Economics after A.Alyshbaev
 Institute of Philosophy and Political-Legal Research
 Center of Methodology of Science and Social Research

Presidents of the Academy of Sciences

The list of presidents of the Academy of Sciences is as follows:

Academicians 

Andrey Korjenkov
Kakish Ryskulova

References

External links
 Kyrgyz Academy of Sciences on The Interacademy Panel site.

Kyrgyzstan
USSR Academy of Sciences
Science and technology in Kyrgyzstan
1943 establishments in the Soviet Union
Scientific organizations established in 1943